The Fairy Pools are a natural waterfall phenomenon in Glen Brittle on the Isle of Skye, on the Allt Coir' a' Mhadaidh (burn of the corrie of the wolf or dog). The pools are a vivid aqua  blue  and are a popular place for wild swimmers who brave the frigid waters.

The habitat of the Fairy Pools hosts a variety of animals, such as red deer, rabbits, and sheep. The area is also host to a large number of birds. Large flocks of crows, ravens, and gulls are present in the area, as well as such smaller birds as meadow pipits, turnstones, common ringed plovers,  grey herons,  dunlins, and curlews. The physical landscape is predominantly rocky, with some boggy areas here and there. The water in the area is typically cold, as the pools are fed by mountain streams.

From being unnamed and virtually unrecognised as a tourist attraction, the Fairy Pools have become a soaringly popular location for walkers, with visitor numbers doubling between 2015 and 2019. It is about a 20-minute walk to the Fairy Pools from the Glen Brittle car park.

The location is in the site of the Battle of Coire Na Creiche.

Internet hoax

In 2013 an internet hoax circulated suggesting the Fairy Pools had sprouted vivid purple flora.  The images circulated were actually of the Shotover River in New Zealand.

References

Landforms of the Isle of Skye